Diplomystes chilensis, the tollo or tollo de agua dulce, is a species of velvet catfish endemic to Chile where it is found in the area of Valparaiso and Santiago.

References

chilensis
Catfish of South America
Freshwater fish of Chile
Endemic fauna of Chile
Fish described in 1782
Taxa named by Juan Ignacio Molina
Taxonomy articles created by Polbot